Saint Teresa's School or Saint Theresa's School may refer to:

Canada
St. Teresa Catholic Elementary School, New Toronto
St. Theresa Catholic Secondary School, Belleville, Ontario

Hong Kong
St. Teresa's School Kowloon
St. Teresa Secondary School, Kowloon

India
St. Teresa's High School, Charni Road, Mumbai
St. Teresa's Secondary School, Kidderpore, Kolkata, West Bengal
St. Theresa’s Boys High School, Bandra, Mumbai
St Theresa’s School, Bendur, Mangalore

Malaysia
St. Teresa's National Secondary School, Kuching, Sarawak

United Kingdom
St Teresa's School Effingham, England
St. Teresa's Primary School, Lurgan, County Armagh, Northern Ireland
St. Teresa's Primary School, Mountnorris, County Armagh, Northern Ireland
St Theresa's Catholic Primary School, Sheffield, England

United States
St. Teresa's Academy, Kansas City, Missouri
Saint Teresa of Avila School, Norristown, Pennsylvania
St. Teresa High School (Decatur, Illinois)
Santa Teresa High School, San Jose, California
St. Theresa School (Coral Gables, Florida)

Zambia
 Ibenga Girls Secondary School, founded in 1963 as St. Theresa's Secondary School

Other uses
St Theresa's Independent State Grammar School for Girls (and Boys), a fictional satirical school in Private Eye

See also
Saint Theresa's College (disambiguation)